St Thomas Hospital is a small 10–20-bed hospital located in the rural village of Kattimoola in the Wayanad district of Kerala, India. The nearest town is Mananthavady and nearest post office is Porur. The hospital is administered by the St Thomas church located nearby. There are usually one or two physicians in the hospital accompanied by a few nursing staff mostly from the nearby convent. The hospital features a small pathology lab which can run a few basic blood / urine tests but has no radiological imaging facility. The hospital is used by locals for treatment of minor illnesses and for out patient management of chronic illnesses. Patients needing advanced investigations or treatment are usually referred to the nearby town of Mananthavady. The service is especially busy on Sunday mornings during / after the mass in the nearby St Thomas church. 
Kattimoola is a village located mostly on the hill side near Mananthavady. There is only one road leading on to Mananthavadi which takes approximately one hour by bus. It consists of steep climbs and a few hair-pin turns,

External links
Kattimoola at Wikimapia

Hospitals in Kerala
Buildings and structures in Wayanad district
Year of establishment missing